Route 46 may refer to:

Dublin Bus (No. 46A)
London Buses route 46

See also
List of highways numbered 46

46